Michael Wynn-Jones (born September 1941) is a Welsh writer, editor and publisher. He is the joint majority shareholder of Norwich City Football Club, with his wife, the former television cook  Delia Smith.

Early life
Wynn-Jones studied at Lancing College and the University of Oxford, and is a writer, editor and publisher. His father was a Church of England vicar in Tivetshall and Redenhall with Harleston, and his mother was a teacher at Diss Grammar School. Wynn-Jones married Delia Smith in 1971 in Stowmarket, Suffolk. Wynn-Jones established New Crane Publishing, which produced some of Smith's books as well as the Sainsbury's magazine, which Wynn-Jones edited. In 2005, New Crane Publishing was sold to Seven Publishing for around £7 million; Smith had been working as a consultant for the publishing company. Wynn-Jones was the former deputy editor of the Daily Mirror'''s midweek colour supplement Mirror Magazine, during which time in 1969 it hired Delia Smith in her first role as a cookery writer. In 1972, George Gale appointed Wynn-Jones as deputy editor of The Spectator, and he has also worked for the Twentieth Century and Nova magazines. Wynn-Jones has also written many books, including The Cartoon History of Britain, George Cruikshank: His Life and London about George Cruikshank, and 100 Years on the Road: A Social History of the Car. In her autobiography, Brigid Keenan thanked Wynn-Jones for asking her to write a column on expats for him in the Sainsbury's magazine.

Norwich City
Wynn-Jones attended his first Norwich City F.C. match in 1953. In 1997 he became the current joint majority shareholder of Norwich City F.C. with his wife Delia Smith. In Tales From The City'', a series of books about the history of Norwich City F.C. published in 2015, Wynn-Jones says that in 1996 former majority shareholder Geoffrey Watling invited them to make a loan to the club, in exchange for board of directors positions at the club. They later purchased Watling's shares in the club, making them majority shareholders, and in 1998, Wynn-Jones and Smith owned 63% of the club's shares. By 2006, their share in the club had reduced to 57%, and in 2015 their share had reduced again to 53%. In 2013, the pair wrote off £2.1 million of debt that the club owed them, as part of a £23 million reduction in the club's deficit; it has been estimated that Wynn-Jones and Smith have invested around £12 million into the club since 1996. In the 2015–16 season, Wynn-Jones and Smith's estimated worth was reportedly £23 million, the least of any Premier League club owners. Roy Waller wrote of Wynn-Jones and Smith that they are "crucial to the club's success", as they invested a lot with "very little return"; Waller noted that Wynn-Jones attends every Norwich match, both home and away, and often chose to sit with the fans during matches, rather than being in the directors' box.

References

Living people
British publishers (people)
Norwich City F.C.
People from Stowmarket
1941 births
Alumni of the University of Oxford
Welsh football chairmen and investors
Chairmen and investors of football clubs in England